Grease: The New Broadway Cast Recording is the cast album for the 2007 Broadway production of the hit musical, Grease. The show, directed by Tony Award-winner Kathleen Marshall, played at the Brooks Atkinson Theatre in New York City. This recording features performances from the cast of Grease including Jenny Powers, Matthew Saldivar, and Grease: You're the One That I Want winners, Laura Osnes and Max Crumm as Sandy Dumbrowski and Danny Zuko, respectively.

Track listing

Personnel

Cast
 Max Crumm – Danny Zuko
 Laura Osnes – Sandy Dumbrowski
 Ryan Patrick Binder – Doody
 Jeb Brown – Vince Fontaine
 Stephen R. Buntrock – Teen Angel
 Daniel Everidge – Roger
 Allison Fischer – Patty Simcox
 Robyn Hurder – Marty
 Lindsay Mendez – Jan
 Jenny Powers – Betty Rizzo
 Jose Restrepo – Sonny 
 Matthew Saldívar – Kenickie
 Kirsten Wyatt – Frenchy

Production
 David Lai – production, A&R, audio engineering, audio production
 David Leonard – production, audio production, engineer mixing
 Isaiah Abolin – audio engineering, mixing
 Ian Kagey – audio engineering
 Hyomin Kang – audio engineering
 Seamus Tyson - audio engineering
 Andrew Mendelson – mastering
 Howard Joines – music coordination
 Kimberly Grigsby – music direction
 Randy Cohen – synthesizer programming

Musicians
 Kimberly Grigsby – conducting, synthesizer
 Chris Fenwick – associate conducting, piano, synthesizer
 Jim Hershman – acoustic guitar, electric guitar
 Michael Blanco – acoustic bass, electric bass, double bass
 John Clancy – conga, drums
 John Scarpulla – tenor saxophone, woodwind
 Jack Bashkow – baritone saxophone, woodwind

See also
 Grease (musical)
 Grease (film)

External links
 Grease on Broadway - Official Web Site
 Sony Music Store page for Grease

Cast recordings
2007 soundtrack albums
Theatre soundtracks
Grease (musical)